Blumberg is a surname of German origin. The word is composed of "blum(e)" (which means "flower") and "berg" (which means "mount, mountain"), and refers to hilly places covered with flowers. German, Dutch, Scandinavian and anglicized variant spellings are Blumenberg, Blomberg, Bloemberg and Bloomberg. Many with the name are of Ashkenazi descent; its Sephardi equivalent is Montefiore.

List of people surnamed Blumberg
 Albert Blumberg (born 1906), philosophy professor who went on to be active within the American Communist party
 Alex Blumberg, producer for the radio and television show This American Life
 Axel Blumberg (1981–2004), Argentine student who was kidnapped and killed
 Baruch Samuel Blumberg (1925–2011), American scientist who identified the Hepatitis B virus
 Carol Joyce Blumberg, American statistician
 George Blumberg (1903–1960), American politician from New York
 Jacob Moritz Blumberg (1873–1955), German surgeon and gynaecologist
 Juan Carlos Blumberg, Argentine textile entrepreneur, father of Axel
 Judy Blumberg (born 1960), American ice dancer
 Mark Blumberg (born 1961), American psychologist
 Rachel Blumberg, American musician
 Skip Blumberg, American video artist and TV producer
 Stephen Blumberg (born 1948), American convicted schizophrenic bibliomaniac
 William Blumberg (born 1998), American tennis player

See also
Blumberg theorem
Blumenberg (surname)
Bloomberg (disambiguation)
Blomberg (surname)
Blumbergs (masculine), Blumberga (feminine), the Latvian-language spelling of the surname
Jeff Bloemberg (born 1968), Canadian ice-hockey player

German-language surnames
Ashkenazi surnames